Surya Bhan Singh is an Indian politician and a member of 17th Legislative Assembly, Uttar Pradesh of India. He represents the ‘Sultanpur ’ constituency in Sultanpur district of Uttar Pradesh.

Political career
Surya Bhan Singh contested Uttar Pradesh Assembly Election as Bharatiya Janata Party candidate and defeated his close contestant Mujeed Ahmad from Bahujan Samaj Party with a margin of 32,393 votes.

Posts held

References

Bharatiya Janata Party politicians from Uttar Pradesh
Living people
Uttar Pradesh MLAs 2017–2022
Year of birth missing (living people)